The 2019 Oceania Rugby Women's Championship that was held in Fiji, was the 2021 Rugby World Cup qualifier for the Oceania region. The tournament was played at Churchill Park in Lautoka from 18–30 November 2019, with six teams entered. Australia and New Zealand sent development teams, having already qualified for the 2021 World Cup.

Teams

Format 
A split pool format was used for the Oceania tournament, with the teams seeded into two pools of three. Each team was scheduled to play one match against each of the teams in the opposite pool. However, following a measles outbreak in Tonga, the Tongan women's team had to withdraw from competition after one of their players arriving in Fiji was suspected of having measles. The tournament continued without playing their fixtures but a revised qualification process was put in place to allow Tonga to challenge later for the Oceania berth at the Rugby World Cup repechage qualifier.

The Black Ferns Development XV were undefeated in the tournament and won the 2019 Oceania Rugby Women's Championship based on the combined pool standings, with Australia A as runner-up. Qualification to the World Cup remained up for grabs in Lautoka for the remaining three nations (excluding Australia and New Zealand). Fiji won direct entry to the World Cup by defeating Samoa in the qualifying playoff match.

Arrangements were made for a playoff match in early 2020 between Tonga and Papua New Guinea, with the winner to meet Samoa in another playoff match to decide the World Cup repechage berth.

Tournament

Pool stage

Round 1

Notes: 
 The match was cancelled and called a draw.Round 2
   

Round 3

Playoffs
Samoa and Fiji played in the World Cup qualifier match at Lautoka. Due to Tonga's absence, a consolation match was arranged for Papua New Guinea against a Fiji developmental team.

Consolation match

World Cup qualifier

Repechage qualifiers
Tonga traveled to Port Moresby in March the following year and defeated Papua New Guinea to set up a playoff against Samoa to determine who qualified for the repechage tournament.

References 

2019 in women's rugby union
2019 in Oceanian rugby union
2019 in Fijian sport
Oceania Rugby Women's Championship
Oceania Rugby Women's Championship
Oceania Rugby Women's Championship